Reg Anderson may refer to:
 Reg Anderson (cricketer) (1914–1972), Welsh cricketer
 Reg Anderson (footballer) (1916–1942), English footballer